Tommy Davidsson (born 9 September 1952) is a former Swedish footballer and manager. He made 168 Allsvenskan appearances for Djurgårdens IF. He is now working within the Djurgårdens IF youth department.

References

Swedish footballers
Sweden youth international footballers
Allsvenskan players
Djurgårdens IF Fotboll players
Hammarby Fotboll managers
Djurgårdens IF Fotboll non-playing staff
1952 births
Living people
Association football defenders
Swedish football managers